World Series Baseball may refer to:
Intellivision World Series Baseball, a 1983 video game for the Mattel Intellivision
World Series Baseball (series), a video game series developed by Sega
World Series Baseball (1994 video game), first game of the World Series Baseball series released in 1994
World Series Baseball (1995 video game), a Sega Saturn video game released in 1995

See also 
World Series, the Major League Baseball championship after which these games are named